Fashion Nugget is the second studio album by alternative rock band Cake. It was released in 1996, and contains 14 songs. "The Distance" and "I Will Survive" became the most successful singles on the record, with the prior peaking at number 22 in the UK and at number 4 on the US Alternative Airplay Chart.
The album was recorded at Paradise Studios in Sacramento, California.

On December 9, 1996, the album was certified gold by the RIAA, and the next year, the album was certified platinum for shipments of one million copies.

Style
The album contains elements of alternative rock, rock, funk, hip hop, rockabilly, jazz, country, pop rock, folk rock, and Latin music.

Track listing

Personnel
Cake
John McCrea – lead vocals, acoustic guitar and keyboards
Greg Brown – electric guitar and keyboards
Vince DiFiore – trumpet and percussion
Victor Damiani – bass
Todd Roper – drums and percussion

Guests
Greg Vincent – pedal steel guitar (track 12)

Appearances in other media
 The Daria episode "The Road Worrier" featured the song "Frank Sinatra". The song "Daria" was used as closing credits for "The New Kid" and "Friend Is a Four-Letter Word" was the closing credit theme of episode 13 of season 4 : "Dye! Dye! My Darling".
 The song "Frank Sinatra" was also featured at the close of The Sopranos episode "The Legend of Tennessee Moltisanti".
 Cake's cover of "I Will Survive" was featured in the 1998 French film Those Who Love Me Can Take the Train, the 2004 Japanese movie Survive Style 5+, the 2002 film Secretary, and the 2003 Canadian comedy, Mambo Italiano.
 "Open Book" was featured on the soundtrack to the 2001 film Sidewalks of New York.
 "Stickshifts and Safetybelts" is featured in the film Waking Up in Reno.
 "Stickshifts and Safetybelts" was featured on the Las Vegas callback episode of Season 6 of So You Think You Can Dance.
 For two years, "The Distance" was used in the TV advert for the Powers Irish Grand National, a horse race which takes place in Dublin, Ireland every Easter Monday.
 An instrumental version of "The Distance" was used in Episode 13 of Season 11 of The Simpsons, called "Saddlesore Galactica".
 Excerpts of "Stickshifts and Safetybelts" are often used as bumpers on The Splendid Table, which is produced by American Public Media and airs on public radio stations nationwide.
 The cover of "I Will Survive" and other songs from Fashion Nugget are used in the German film Herr Lehmann.
 An instrumental and uptempo version of the song "Italian Leather Sofa" plays over the opening credits of the animated cartoon "Mission Hill" (1999–2002).
 "Perhaps, Perhaps, Perhaps" is featured on the soundtrack of the movies Dream for an Insomniac and Welcome to Woop Woop.
 The cover of "I Will Survive" was used in the Italian movie L'uomo in più (One man up).
 "Perhaps, Perhaps, Perhaps" was used in Snapple commercials
 "The Distance" was used in Amazon Echo commercials in 2015.
 PBS Kids used "The Distance" in a commercial for Maya & Miguel
 The cover of "I Will Survive" appears in The Click, a pilot for the MTV show Undergrads.
 A cover of "Friend is a Four Letter Word" was sung by the cast of Dear White People (season 4, episode 7). 
 "Frank Sinatra" was used in episode 2 of Pepsi, Where's My Jet?

Charts

Weekly charts

Year-end charts

Certifications

References

1996 albums
Cake (band) albums
Capricorn Records albums